The second May ministry was formed on 11 June 2017 after Theresa May returned to office following the June 2017 snap general election. The election resulted in a hung parliament with the Conservative Party losing its governing majority in the House of Commons. On 9 June 2017, May announced her intention to form a Conservative minority government, reliant on the confidence and supply of the Democratic Unionist Party; a finalised agreement between the two parties was signed and published on 26 June 2017.

May announced on 24 May 2019 that she would resign as Leader of the Conservative Party on 7 June. She remained in office as caretaker prime minister during the resulting Conservative Party leadership election, before officially resigning on 24 July, after which she was succeeded as Prime Minister by Boris Johnson.

History

The 2017 snap election resulted in a hung parliament, with the Conservative Party holding the most seats in the House of Commons, but without an overall majority. The Democratic Unionist Party (DUP) had suggested that it would be able to provide a coalition or confidence and supply arrangement depending on negotiations. Theresa May, the incumbent Conservative prime minister, announced her intention on 9 June 2017 to form a new minority government with support from the DUP. Both parties indicated that this support would be in the form of a confidence and supply agreement, rather than a formal coalition.

On 10 June, a survey of 1,500 ConservativeHome readers found that almost two-thirds of Conservative Party members wanted Theresa May to resign. A YouGov poll of 1,720 adults for the Sunday Times had 48% saying Theresa May should resign, with 38% against. A Survation poll of 1,036 adults online for the Mail on Sunday had 49% of people wanting her resignation, with 38% against.

On 10 June 2017, 10 Downing Street issued a statement saying that a Conservative–DUP agreement had been reached in principle. A few hours later, the statement was retracted when it was said that it had been "issued in error" and that talks between the two parties were still ongoing. Former Prime Minister John Major was concerned that a deal between the Conservatives and DUP could endanger the Northern Irish peace process.

On 11 June 2017, former Chancellor of the Exchequer George Osborne described May as a "dead woman walking". The Secretary of State for Justice, David Lidington, dismissed speculation about May's future as "gossipy stories". Senior Labour politicians stated that they planned to challenge the Conservative minority government early and to put forward alternative policies in their reply to the Queen's Speech. Jeremy Corbyn said he believed there was a majority in parliament for many issues on which Labour "is sympathetic", giving as examples the repeal of the Under-occupancy penalty ('bedroom tax'), and maintaining the triple lock on pensions and the winter fuel allowance. In an interview on 11 June, Corbyn stated that he expected another election to be held within a year.

Michael Gove said that the minority government would probably reduce austerity and increase spending on public services. Stephen Bush of the New Statesman also expected less austerity, saying that if voters saw continued austerity in England, Scotland and Wales while the government spent generously in Northern Ireland to maintain the pact with the DUP then the Conservatives would become more unpopular. 
A 1% pay cap on public sector workers was under review according to 10 Downing Street. and increasing numbers of high ranking Conservatives wanted to end it.

On the afternoon of 11 June, Theresa May finalised the composition of her cabinet. The senior positions of Chancellor, Foreign Secretary and Home Secretary, as well as the Secretary of State for Exiting the EU, had already been confirmed on 9 June with all four incumbents staying in office. The reshuffle saw prominent Brexiteer MPs, such as Boris Johnson and David Davis, retain their roles, but also resulted in the promotion of Damian Green and David Gauke, both of whom had supported the remain side during the EU referendum. Junior ministerial roles were allocated the following day, with a full list of new ministerial and government appointments confirmed on 12 June.

On 3 July 2017, polls suggested that May's popularity had dropped drastically since the election on 8 June. 60% of voters viewed May less favourably than they had during the election, and she had a net disapproval rating of 20%: 31% approved her leadership, while 51% disapproved. By 7 July, YouGov gave Labour an eight-point lead over the Conservatives (46% to 38%). A New Statesman article argued that a factor in this lead was Office for National Statistics figures showing household disposable incomes falling faster than at any time since 2011.

May reshuffled her cabinet on 8–9 January 2018. Amidst the rejection in three successive votes by parliament of the Brexit withdrawal agreement, she negotiated to leave the European Union. She announced on 24 May 2019 that she would resign as leader of the Conservative Party on 7 June, though she continued to serve as a caretaker until Boris Johnson was elected leader and asked to form a new government on 24 July 2019.

Lord Faulks maintains he tried to introduce a public register of overseas property owners to prevent money laundering in the UK.  Faulks alleges May's government put pressure on him to withdraw the measures claiming it would be addressed in future legislation.  Faulks maintains no such legislation happened.  Faulks said,  “I was obviously misled because nothing has subsequently happened. I can only think a deluded desire to protect the City of London has led to all these delays. (...) Quite frankly, I was leant on. I was leant on by No 10 Downing Street and summoned to a meeting of officials from all sorts of different departments, who told me it was very unfortunate that I was going to do this because the matter was in hand.”

Cabinets

June 2017 – January 2018

Changes
Following allegations of sexual misconduct, Michael Fallon resigned from his post of Defence Secretary on 1 November 2017. He was replaced by Gavin Williamson. Williamson was replaced as Chief Whip by Julian Smith.
After it was revealed that Priti Patel held unsanctioned meetings with Israeli politicians and officials whilst on a family holiday, thereby violating the Ministerial Code, she was forced to resign from her post of International Development Secretary on 8 November 2017. She was replaced by Penny Mordaunt.
Following an inquiry that found that he had violated the Ministerial Code, Damian Green resigned from his post on 20 December 2017.

January 2018 – July 2019

Changes
Following a scandal about immigrant removal targets, Amber Rudd resigned from her post of Home Secretary on 29 April 2018. She was replaced by Sajid Javid, whose former post of Housing Secretary was filled by James Brokenshire.
Brexit Secretary David Davis resigned from his post on 8 July 2018. In his letter of resignation, he cited dissatisfaction with the 6 July "Chequers Agreement” plan for Britain's relationship with the European Union after exit. Minister of State for Housing and Planning Dominic Raab was appointed to fill the vacancy left by Davis the next day. Kit Malthouse replaced Raab as Housing Minister.
Foreign Secretary Boris Johnson resigned from his post on 9 July 2018, reportedly also over dissatisfaction with the Chequers Agreement. Health Secretary Jeremy Hunt was appointed to replace Johnson, whilst Hunt's former post was filled by Culture Secretary Matthew Hancock. Attorney General Jeremy Wright replaced Hancock as Culture Secretary, and backbencher Geoffrey Cox replaced Wright as Attorney General.
Brexit Secretary Dominic Raab and Work and Pensions Secretary Esther McVey resigned on 15 November 2018 following the publication of the draft EU withdrawal agreement the previous day. On 16 November, Amber Rudd was invited to return to cabinet to fill the post of Work and Pensions Secretary, whilst Steve Barclay was appointed as Brexit Secretary.
Following an inquiry into a leak of information from a meeting of the National Security Council, Defence Secretary Gavin Williamson was removed from his post on 1 May 2019. He was replaced by Penny Mordaunt, with her former post of International Development Secretary filled by Rory Stewart.
Andrea Leadsom resigned from her post of Leader of the House of Commons on 22 May 2019. She was replaced by treasury minister Mel Stride, whose post was filled by Minister of State for Transport Jesse Norman. His post was filled by Michael Ellis, and his post was filled by Rebecca Pow.

List of ministers

Prime Minister, the Cabinet Office and non-Departmental ministers

Departments of state

Law officers

Parliament

Notes

References

2010s in British politics
2010s in the United Kingdom
2017 establishments in the United Kingdom
British ministries
Cabinets established in 2017
Government
Ministries of Elizabeth II
Minority governments
Ministry, second
2017 United Kingdom general election